August Mors (20 July 1921 – 8 August 1944) was a Luftwaffe ace and recipient of the Knight's Cross of the Iron Cross during World War II. The Knight's Cross of the Iron Cross was awarded to recognise extreme battlefield bravery or successful military leadership. On 6 August 1944, August Mors was severely wounded after attacking allied bombers. He bailed out, but died two days later on 8 August 1944. He was posthumously awarded the Knight's Cross on 20 October 1944. During his career he was credited with 60 aerial victories, 48 on the Eastern Front and 12 on the Western Front.

Awards
 Flugzeugführerabzeichen
 Front Flying Clasp of the Luftwaffe
 Iron Cross (1939)
 2nd Class
 1st Class
 Knight's Cross of the Iron Cross on 20 October 1944 as Leutnant and pilot in the 1./Jagdgeschwader 5

References

Citations

Bibliography

External links
Aces of the Luftwaffe
TracesOfWar.com

1921 births
1944 deaths
People from Sigmaringen
Luftwaffe pilots
German World War II flying aces
Luftwaffe personnel killed in World War II
Recipients of the Knight's Cross of the Iron Cross
People from the Province of Hohenzollern
Aviators killed by being shot down
Military personnel from Baden-Württemberg